José Tadeu Martins Júnior (born 23 August 1983), simply known as Juninho Tardelli is a Brazilian footballer playing for Marcílio Dias as a midfielder.

External links
Persian League profile

1983 births
Living people
Association football midfielders
Brazilian footballers
Footballers from São Paulo
Atlético Minero footballers
Porto Alegre Futebol Clube players
Clube Esportivo Lajeadense players
Sanat Mes Kerman F.C. players